Eucalyptus densa is a species of mallee or mallet that is endemic to Western Australia. It has smooth greyish bark that is shed in curly strips, linear to narrow lance-shaped adult leaves, long, spindle-shaped flower buds in groups of seven or nine, pale yellow or lemon-coloured flowers and conical, cylindrical or barrel-shaped fruit.

Description
It has smooth. pale grey to cream-coloured bark that is shed in curly flakes. Flowering occurs between January and February or May to September and the flowers are pale yellow or lemon coloured. The fruit is a woody conical, cylindrical or barrel-shaped capsule with the valves near rim level.

Taxonomy and naming
Eucalyptus densa was first formally described in 1991 by the botanists Ian Brooker and Stephen Hopper and the description was published in the journal Nuytsia. The specific epithet (densa) is a Latin word meaning "thick", "close" or "compact", referring to crown of this species.

Brooker and Hopper also described two subspecies and the names have been accepted by the Australian Plant Census:
 Eucalyptus densa subsp. densa  - a short-trunked mallet with a dense crown, often to ground level;

The subspecies name improcera is a Latin word meaning "short" or "undersized", referring to its stature compared to subspecies densa.

Distribution and habitat
This eucalypt is found on ridges, flats and drainage line areas of the southern Wheatbelt and  Goldfields-Esperance regions of Western Australia where it grows in clay, loam, sandy or lateritic soils. Subspecies densa is found between Ongerup, Ravensthorpe and Hyden and subspecies improcera in the Ravensthorpe and Jerramungup areas.

Conservation status
Both subspecies of E. densa are classified as "not threatened" by the Western Australian Government Department of Parks and Wildlife.

See also
List of Eucalyptus species

References

densa
Endemic flora of Western Australia
Mallees (habit)
Myrtales of Australia
Eucalypts of Western Australia
Plants described in 1991
Taxa named by Ian Brooker
Taxa named by Stephen Hopper